Arthur Kaliyev (born June 26, 2001) is an Uzbekistani-born American professional ice hockey forward for the Los Angeles Kings of the National Hockey League (NHL). He was drafted 33rd overall by the Kings in the second round of the 2019 NHL Entry Draft. He made his NHL debut in 2021.

Early life
Kaliyev was born in Uzbekistan but his family moved to Staten Island, New York when he was two-years-old and later moved to Michigan at age 13. He represents the United States in international competition. His sister Elvina Kalieva is a tennis player.

Playing career
As a rookie in the Ontario Hockey League (OHL) in 2017–18 he scored 31 goals to help the Hamilton Bulldogs to a league championship. He followed that up with 51 goals for the Bulldogs in 2018–19, becoming the youngest player in the OHL to score more than 40 goals that season. He is particularly effective at shooting a one timer. Despite his goal scoring prowess, he was regarded as inconsistent, a weak skater and a weak defender, which may have hurt his standing in the 2019 NHL Entry Draft.

On June 3, 2020, Kaliyev was signed to a three-year, entry-level by the Los Angeles Kings. Kaliyev made his NHL debut on February 2, 2021, against the Anaheim Ducks and scored his first goal.

Career statistics

Regular season and playoffs

International

References

External links
 

2001 births
Living people
American men's ice hockey left wingers
Hamilton Bulldogs (OHL) players
Los Angeles Kings draft picks
Los Angeles Kings players
Ontario Reign (AHL) players
Sportspeople from Tashkent
American people of Uzbek descent